Sailajananda Falguni Smriti Mahavidyalaya is one of the general degree colleges in Khayrasol,  in the Birbhum district, West Bengal, India. It offers undergraduate courses in arts. It is affiliated to  University of Burdwan.
It was established in 1998.

Departments

Arts
Bengali
English
Sanskrit
History
Geography
Philosophy

Accreditation
The college is also recognized by the University Grants Commission (UGC).

See also

References

External links
 sfsmahavidyalaya.org

Colleges affiliated to University of Burdwan
Educational institutions established in 1998
Universities and colleges in Birbhum district
1998 establishments in West Bengal